Stormy Sea may refer to:

 Stormy Seas (film), a 1923 U.S. film
 Stormy Sea (song), a 1991 song by Susumu Hirasawa off the album Virtual Rabbit
 A Stormy Sea (song), a 1998 song from the movie soundtrack album Pokémon: The First Movie (soundtrack)
 Stormy Sea (Emil Nolde), a 1930 landscape painting by Emil Nolde
 Stormy Sea in Étretat, a 1883 painting by Claude Monet
 Stormy Sea at Night, a 1849 painting by Ivan Aivazovsky; see 1849 in art
 Stormy Sea, a series of 1600s paintings by Jacob van Ruisdael; see List of paintings by Jacob van Ruisdael

See also

 Incantation for a Stormy Sea (song), an a cappella composition
 The Storm at Sea, a 1559 oil painting by Pieter Bruegel the Elder
 Storm Aviation Sea Storm, a home-built flying boat kitplane
 Sea of Storms (disambiguation)
 
 Stormy (disambiguation)
 Sea (disambiguation)